Kevin Bray is an American film, television, commercial and music video director. Bray attended the University of Michigan and the University of Paris (Sorbonne) before completing his studies at New York University's Tisch School of the Arts. Bray also goes by his initials, KGB.

Career
Beginning his career as a music video director, Bray has directed music videos for a number of artists, including Anita Baker, Jessica Simpson, Jennifer Lopez, Brandy, Christina Aguilera, Lauryn Hill, De La Soul, Whitney Houston, Savage Garden, Celine Dion, among others.

Film
 All About the Benjamins (2002)
 Walking Tall (2004)
 Linewatch (Director and Executive Producer, 2008)
 Friday After Next (2002; Second Unit Director)

Television
 Director
 The Morning Show (1 episode, 2019)
 Succession (2 episodes, 2019-2021)
 Black-ish (8 episodes, 2015–2022)
 Pearson (3 episodes, 2019)
 Mike Epps: Only One Mike (Netflix special)
 Bless This Mess (1 episode, 2019)
 Future Man (2 episodes, 2019)
 Dear White People (1 episode, 2018)
 Insecure (5 episodes; 2016–2018)
 The Americans (2 episodes, 2017–2018)
 Fresh Off the Boat (2 episodes, 2017–2018)
 Grown-ish (1 episode, 2018)
 The Mayor (1 episode, 2017)
 The Real O'Neals (1 episode, 2017) 
 Shooter (1 episode, 2017) 
 Zoobiquity (TV movie, 2016)
 Empire (2 episodes, 2016) 
 Suits (12 episodes, 2011–2016)
 Suits (Webisodes, 2012)
 Agent X (1 episode, 2015)
 How To Get Away with Murder (1 episode, 2015) 
 Scandal (1 episode, 2015)  
 Person of Interest (2 episodes, 2012–2015)
 Stalker (2 episodes, 2014–2015)
 CSI:Crime Scene Investigation (1 episode, 2014) 
 Satisfaction (2 episodes, 2014) 
 Franklin & Bash (2 episodes, 2012–2014)
 White Collar (4 episodes, 2009–2013)
 The Arrangement (TV movie, 2013)
 Law & Order: Special Victims Unit (1 episode, 2013) 
 The Killing (1 episode, 2012) 
 Charlie's Angels (1 episode, 2011) 
 NCIS: Los Angeles (1 episode, 2011) 
 Memphis Beat (1 episode, 2010)
 Burn Notice (3 episodes, 2010)
 The Good Guys (1 episode, 2010) 
 Law & Order: Criminal Intent (3 episodes, 2010) 
 The Vampire Diaries (2 episodes, 2009–2010)
 Cold Case (12 episodes, 2004–2009)
 Chuck (1 episode, 2009) 
 The Black Donnellys (1 episode, 2007)
 Heroes (1 episode, 2007)
 Justice (1 episode, 2006) 
 Close to Home (1 episode, 2006) 
 In Justice (1 episode, 2006) 
 The Studio (TV series, 2005)
 Veronica Mars (1 episode, 2005) 
 Criminal Minds (1 episode, 2005) 
 Barbershop (1 episode, 2005) 
 Silver Lake (TV movie, 2004)
 CSI: NY (1 episode, 2004) 
 Platinum (2 episodes, 2003) 
 The Twilight Zone (1 episode, 2003) 
 The Bernie Mac Show (1 episode, 2003) 
 Elmopalooza (Segment director, 1998)

 Executive producer and/or director
 Platinum Pearson (Executive producer – 7 episodes, 2019)
 Zoobiquity (TV movie, 2016)
 The Arrangement (TV movie, 2013) (Co-executive producer)
 Suits (Co-executive producer – 16 episodes, 2012 – 2013; Supervising producer – 12 episodes, 2011 – 2012)

 Producer
 Platinum (2003)

 Actor
 All About the Benjamins (2002; role: Criminal)
 Billy Turner's Secret (1991; role: Party People)

 Documentary appearances
 Jean-Michel Basquiat: The Radiant Child (2004)
 Biography, Episode: "The Rock" (2004)
 Fight the Good Fight (2002; Director)
 Whitney Houston: The True Story (2002; Video Director)
 All About the Stunts (Video documentary short) (2002)
 Miami Nice (Video documentary short) (2002)
 Shot Caller: From Videos to Features (Video documentary short) (2002)
 Strictly Business: Making 'All About the Benjamins' (Video documentary short) (1999)
 Making the Video (TV documentary series) (1999), featuring the making of Whitney Houston's videos for the singles "I Learned From The Best" and "Where You Are".

 Commercials
 USA Network
 Nike
 Puma
 Verizon
 Florida Lottery

Music Videos
 1988
 De La Soul – "Potholes in My Lawn"

 1991
 Eric B. & Rakim – "Juice (Know the Ledge)"

 1992
 Black Sheep – "Strobelite Honey"
 Vanessa Williams – "Save the Best For Last" (holiday version)
 Sounds of Blackness – "Testify"

 1994
 Vanessa Williams – "The Sweetest Days" (romantic and urban versions)
 Patti LaBelle – "All This Love"

 1995
 Diana King – "Ain't Nobody"
 Monica – "Before You Walk Out of My Life"

 1996
 For Real – "Like I Do"
 Meshell Ndegeocello – "Leviticus: Faggot"
 Monica – "Why I Love You So Much"
 Celine Dion – "Because You Loved Me"
 The Corrs – "The Right Time"
 Aaron Neville – "Can't Stop My Heart From Loving You (The Rain Song)"
 Robyn – "Do You Know (What It Takes)"

 1997
 Ben Folds Five – "Brick"
 Mary J. Blige feat. Lil' Kim – "I Can Love You"
 Robyn – "Show Me Love"

 1998
 Brandy – "Have You Ever?"

 1999
 Jennifer Lopez – "No Me Ames"
 Savage Garden – "I Knew I Loved You"
 Whitney Houston – "I Learned from the Best"
 Brandy – "Almost Doesn't Count"
 Whitney Houston – "My Love Is Your Love"
 Whitney Houston – "It's Not Right But It's Okay"
 Whitney Houston, Faith Evans and Kelly Price – "Heartbreak Hotel"

 2000
 Whitney Houston and George Michael – "If I Told You That"
 Christina Aguilera – "Pero Me Acuerdo de Ti"
 Whitney Houston – "Fine"
 Jessica Simpson and Nick Lachey – "Where You Are"

 2002
 Whitney Houston – "One of Those Days"
 Deborah Cox – "Up & Down (In & Out)"
 Whitney Houston – "Whatchulookinat"

 2004
 Luther Vandross – "Your Secret Love"

 2008
 Ashanti – "The Way That I Love You"

Awards & Nominations
 Hugo Award for Best Dramatic Presentation: Heroes'', Season One (Nomination, 2006)

References

External links
 
 

African-American film directors
African-American television directors
American film directors
American television directors
American music video directors
Television commercial directors
Living people
Tisch School of the Arts alumni
University of Michigan alumni
University of Paris alumni
Place of birth missing (living people)
Year of birth missing (living people)
American expatriates in France